Westringia crassifolia, commonly known as whipstick westringia,  is a flowering plant in the family Lamiaceae and is  endemic to Victoria, Australia. It is a rare shrub with narrow leaves and lavender-purple or pink flowers in spring.

Description
Flowering occurs in August and September, and the fruit is a dry four-seeded nutlet.<ref name=Nevill>{{cite web  |author1=Nevill, Geoff |author2=Camilleri, Mary |title =National Recovery Plan for the Whipstick Westringia Westringia crassifolia|publisher = Department of Sustainability and Environment (Victoria)|date= 2010| url =http://www.environment.gov.au/resource/national-recovery-plan-whipstick-westringia-westringia-crassifolia|access-date=8 November 2014}}</ref>

Taxonomy and namingWestringia crassifolia was first formally described in 1957 by  Norman Wakefield and the description was published in The Victorian Naturalist.The specific epithet (crassifolia) means "thick leaved".

Distribution and habitat
Whipstick westringia is restricted to two locations, near Bendigo and the other in the Little Desert growing on sand or sandy soils on lower slopes and in shallow gullies.

ConservationWestringia crassifolia is listed as "endangered" under the Commonwealth Environment Protection and Biodiversity Conservation Act 1999, "endangered" on the Department of Sustainability and Environment's Advisory List of Rare Or Threatened Plants In Victoria'' and "threatened" under the Victorian Flora and Fauna Guarantee Act 1988.There are estimated to be about 640 plants left in the wild.

References

crassifolia
Flora of Victoria (Australia)
Endangered flora of Australia
Lamiales of Australia
Taxa named by Norman Arthur Wakefield
Plants described in 1957